Chondrilla is the scientific name shared by two genera of life-forms:

 Chondrilla (plant), a plant genus in family Asteraceae
 Chondrilla (sponge), a sea sponge genus